Mandeville is the capital and largest town in the parish of Manchester in the county of Middlesex, Jamaica. In 2005, the town had an estimated population of 50,000, and including the immediate suburbs within a radius of  the total population was about 72,000. It is the only parish capital of Jamaica not located on the coast or on a major river.

Mandeville has a town square, parish church and clock tower, and many large, elegant early nineteenth-century houses line the winding streets in the town centre.

In the suburbs of the town many large houses have been built by returning residents from North America and the United Kingdom on an ad hoc basis.  Developers have complemented these with large housing developments, some of which are constructed as gated communities.  Prominent suburbs and surrounding areas include Ingleside, Battersea, Knockpatrick, Clover, Waltham, Bloomfield, Caledonia Meadows, Brumalia, Newport, Spur Tree, Kingsland, French Park, Swabys Hope, Lincoln, Greenvale and Marshalls Pen.

Mandeville is a major commercial centre, and is the location of Northern Caribbean University (formerly West Indies College), a Seventh-day Adventist institution of higher learning.

The mayor of Mandeville in 2012 was Brenda Ramsay.

History

The town was laid out in 1816, and named after Viscount Mandeville, the eldest son of the Duke of Manchester, who was then governor of Jamaica.

Many of the original buildings can still be seen such as the courthouse, an impressive building of cut limestone with a horseshoe staircase and a raised portico supported by Doric columns and built in 1820. The staircase was added in about 1900.

Many of Jamaica's oldest businesses were started in Mandeville; the Mandeville Hotel, one of the oldest in the Caribbean, began operations in 1875. Its golf club, founded as the Manchester Golf Club in 1868, was the first golf course in the Caribbean. The first "free library" in Jamaica was established in 1938, and is the oldest Parish Library.

The growth of the town was given a substantial stimulus when the Alcan Bauxite Company in a joint venture with the Jamaican Government opened its Kirkvine works nearby at Williamsfield in 1957. It built houses at Mandeville for its then mostly expatriate staff. The relatively high wages lured many educated Jamaicans there. Subsequently, the town has seen an influx of Jamaican residents returning from abroad.

Notable people

 Annastasia Baker, UK based Gospel, R&B, soul singer and songwriter
 Kimour Bruce, sprinter
 Kemoy Campbell, distance runner
 William "Bunny Rugs" Clarke, frontman for the Reggae/R&B band Third World
 Charmaine Crooks, Olympic athlete
 Paul R. Cunningham, Jamaican American surgeon
 Heavy D (born Dwight Arrington Myers), rapper
 Jovan Haye, current defensive ends coach for the Vanderbilt Commodores and former defensive lineman for the NFL
 Colin Heron, first-class cricketer
 Jacob Miller, reggae musician
 Alfred George Nash, civil engineer and legislator
 Lovel Palmer, Jamaican and international footballer
 Sheryl Lee Ralph, actress and singer
 Rumeal Robinson (born 1966), basketball player
 Garnett Silk (born 1966 - died 1994) reggae singer
 William Henry Pickering, astronomer

See also
Manchester Local Sustainable Development Plan

References

External links

Populated places established in 1816
1816 establishments in the British Empire
Populated places in Manchester Parish